Djenahro Nunumete (born 28 January 2002) is a Dutch professional footballer who plays as a midfielder for Eredivisie club SC Heerenveen.

Personal life
Nunumete is of Indonesia descent, via his father with roots in Molucca.

References

External links

2002 births
Living people
Dutch footballers
Dutch people of Indonesian descent
Association football midfielders
SC Heerenveen players
Eredivisie players
Footballers from Groningen (city)